Vicki Daldy (born 24 October 1966) is a retired Australian women's basketball player, who represented the country at both junior and senior levels. Her married name is Vicki Valk.

Biography

Daldy commenced playing in the Women's National Basketball League (WNBL) in 1984. Since then, Daldy played for the North Adelaide Rockets (1984 to 1991), West Adelaide Bearcats (1992); Adelaide Link (1993 to 1994) and Dandenong Rangers (1996), totaling 247 games. Daldy retired following the completion of the 1996 season.

Daldy was also selected to the WNBL All-Star Five on three occasions; 1990, 1991 and 1993. In 1992, Daldy would win the Halls Medal for the best and fairest player in the South Australian Women's competition. Daldy was awarded WNBL Life Membership, as an inaugural member. At official FIBA events, Daldy represented Australia at the 1992 World Olympic Qualifying Tournament for Women.

Following her retirement, Daldy became a coach of the Adelaide Lightning and a player and development officer with Basketball South Australia.

See also

 WNBL All-Star Five

References

Living people
Australian women's basketball players
1966 births
Basketball players from Adelaide
Sportswomen from South Australia
Adelaide Lightning players
Dandenong Rangers players
Guards (basketball)